"Leathers" is the first single from the American alternative metal band Deftones' seventh album, Koi No Yokan, and their 17th single overall. The song was made available on September 19, 2012 for free download on the band's official website, before being released as a digital download on iTunes. It was also the first Koi No Yokan track to be made public, almost two months before the album was officially released.

Deftones also issued the song as a cassette single, featuring album track "Rosemary" as a B-side,  during the promotional North American tour of October–November 2012. The cassette single was available at the merchandise stand to the first 50 fans at each stop of the tour who preordered Koi No Yokan.

In 2012, Loudwire ranked the song number six on their list of the 10 greatest Deftones songs, and in 2020, Kerrang ranked the song number nine on their list of the 20 greatest Deftones songs.

Track listing

Personnel
 Abe Cunningham − drums
 Stephen Carpenter − guitar
 Frank Delgado − samples, keyboards
 Chino Moreno − vocals, guitar
 Sergio Vega − bass

Technical personnel
 Nick Raskulinecz − production

References

Deftones songs
2012 singles
Songs written by Chino Moreno
Songs written by Sergio Vega (bassist)
Songs written by Stephen Carpenter
2012 songs
Reprise Records singles
Song recordings produced by Nick Raskulinecz
Songs written by Abe Cunningham
Songs written by Frank Delgado (American musician)